Ana María Alejandra Mendieta Trefogli is a Peruvian lawyer and politician. She was the Minister of Women and Vulnerable Populations in the government of Martín Vizcarra from April 2018 until March 2019; she succeeded Ana María Choquehuanca in the position, and was herself succeeded by Gloria Montenegro. She is a graduate of the Pontifical Catholic University of Peru and of Federico Villarreal National University.

References

Year of birth missing (living people)
Living people
Women's ministers of Peru
Women government ministers of Peru
21st-century Peruvian lawyers
21st-century women lawyers
21st-century Peruvian politicians
21st-century Peruvian women politicians
Pontifical Catholic University of Peru alumni
Federico Villarreal National University alumni